The dorsal carpal arch (dorsal carpal network, posterior carpal arch) is an anatomical term for the combination (anastomosis) of dorsal carpal branch of the radial artery and the dorsal carpal branch of the ulnar artery near the back of the wrist.

It is made up of the dorsal carpal branches of both the ulnar and radial arteries.  It also anastomoses with the anterior interosseous artery and the posterior interosseous artery.  The arch gives off three dorsal metacarpal arteries.

See also
 Palmar carpal arch
 Deep palmar arch
 Superficial palmar arch

References

External links

Arteries of the upper limb